Fazila is a feminine given name. Notable people with the name include:

 Fazila Kaiser, Pakistani actress, producer, writer, and chef
 Fazila Allana (born 1970), Indian businesswoman
 Fazila Aliani (born 1945), Pakistani activist and politician
 Fazila Samadova (1929–2020), Azerbaijani scientist

Feminine given names